The 2014 Southern Utah Thunderbirds football team represented Southern Utah University in the 2014 NCAA Division I FCS football season. They were led by seventh-year head coach Ed Lamb and played their home games at Eccles Coliseum. This was their third year as a member of the Big Sky Conference. They finished the season 3–9, 3–5 in Big Sky play to finish in a tie for eighth place.

Schedule

 Source: Schedule

References

Southern Utah
Southern Utah Thunderbirds football seasons
Southern Utah Thunderbirds football